Estlink is a set of HVDC submarine power cables between Estonia and Finland. Estlink 1 is the first interconnection between the Baltic and Nordic electricity markets followed by Estlink 2 in 2014.  The main purpose of the Estlink connection is to secure power supply in both regions to integrate the Baltic and Nordic energy markets.

Estlink 1

History
First plans for a submarine power cable between the Baltic and the Nordic regions were proposed in 1990s.  Negotiations between Eesti Energia, Pohjolan Voima, Helsingin Energia, Graninge (now E.ON Sverige), Latvenergo, Statkraft and TXE Nordic Energy, a subsidiary of TXU (now Energy Future Holdings Corporation) started In 1999, and on 9 October 2001 a contract was signed in Tallinn.  However, only after the harsh winter of 2002–2003 which resulted in an increased demand for power, the project of the submarine cable between Estonia and Finland got a boost.  The letter of intention for underwater sea cable was signed between Eesti Energia, Pohjolan Voima, Helsingin Energia and Latvenergo on 31 March 2003.  In May 2004, the Lithuanian power company Lietuvos Energija agreed to participate in the project, shortly after which the project company AS Nordic Energy Link was established. On 29 April 2005, the Estlink project was launched.  Construction of Harku converter station and land cable installation begins on 5 April 2006.  The submarine cable was laid in September 2006.  The Estlink cable was inaugurated on 4 December 2006 and it became fully operational on 5 January 2007.

The Estlink 1 cable was operated by AS Nordic Energy Link company, founded by Baltic and Finnish power companies. The main shareholder was Eesti Energia with 39.9% of the shares, Latvenergo and Lietuvos Energija had 25% each, and the remaining 10.1% was divided between Pohjolan Voima and Helsingin Energia (operating through their joint project company Finestlink).  On 30 December 2013 the interconnector was sold to the transmission system operators Elering and Fingrid.

Description
The installation of land cable began on 4 May 2006 in Harku. The submarine cable was laid on the seabed of the Gulf of Finland in the autumn of 2006.

The cable is constructed by ABB.  The submarine cable was laid by Global Marine Systems using the Sovereign service vessel.  The project cost €110 million.

Sites

Estlink 2

History
A preliminary agreement on EstLink 2 was signed between Elering and Fingrid on 15 February 2010 in Tallinn.  Capital investment decision by Fingrid was made on 20 May 2010.  A construction agreement was signed on 1 November 2010.

On 23 December 2010, the contract to manufacture and install the subsea and underground cables was awarded to Nexans, the contract to build converter stations was awarded to Siemens, the contract to build the Nikuviken cable terminal station and to expand the Anttila substation in Finland was awarded to Empower Oy, and the contract to build the transmission line between Anttila and Nikuviken was awarded to ETDE, a part of Bouygues.

Laying of the cable started on 15 October 2012 and it is laid by the cable ship Nexans Skagerrak.  The cable testing started on 22 October 2013.  A trial operation started on 6 December 2013 and continued until 6 February 2014 after which it started commercial operations.  It was officially inaugurated on 6 March 2014.

Description

Estlink 2 will be a classic bidirectional monopolar high-voltage direct current connection with line-commutated converter thyristors. Its maximum transmission rate will be 650 MW and it will operate with a voltage of 450 kV.  Its estimated cost is about €320 million, of which converter stations cost €100 million and cable €180 million.  The European Commission has decided to allocate €100 million to the project.

Sites

Waypoints of overhead line in Finland

Estlink 3

On June 28, 2022, Elering and Fingrid signed a memorandum of understanding to begin planning for a third submarine cable, EstLink3, with a capacity of up to 1000 MW, expected to be completed by 2035.

See also 

 Baltic Cable (between Germany and Sweden)
 Balticconnector (proposed gas pipeline between Estonia and Finland)
 Fenno-Skan (between Finland and Sweden)
 NordBalt (between Lithuania and Sweden)
 SwePol (between Poland and Sweden)
 List of HVDC projects

References

External links
 Nordic Energy Link
 Estlink 2 Newsletter. issue 2, May 2011 (PDF)

Electrical interconnectors to and from the Baltic grid
Electrical interconnectors to and from the Nordic grid
Energy infrastructure completed in 2006
Energy infrastructure completed in 2014
HVDC transmission lines
Submarine power cables
Connections across the Baltic Sea
Electric power infrastructure in Estonia
Electric power infrastructure in Finland
Estonia–Finland relations
2006 establishments in Estonia
2006 establishments in Finland